The Orlando Miracle were a Women's National Basketball Association (WNBA) team based in Orlando, Florida. It began play in the 1999 WNBA season. The Miracle relocated, in 2003, to Uncasville, Connecticut, where the team became the Connecticut Sun. The Miracle was a sister team to the NBA's Orlando Magic.

Franchise history
The city of Orlando was granted an expansion franchise in 1998, and the Orlando Miracle took the floor for the 1999 WNBA season.

The Miracle posted respectable records in their four years of existence (1999–2002). The Miracle made the playoffs once, in 2000, and lost in the first round against the Cleveland Rockers. In 2001, the Miracle took a step backwards, but they hosted a very successful  2001 WNBA All-Star Game. In 2002, the Miracle posted a 16-16 (.500) record, tying for the final playoff spot with the Indiana Fever, but the Miracle lost the tie-breaker, so barely missed the playoffs. The 2002 season would prove to be the Miracle's last in Orlando.

Relocation to Connecticut
After the 2002 WNBA season, the NBA sold off all of the WNBA franchises to the operators of the teams. Magic owner Rich DeVos was not interested in keeping the Miracle, and no local ownership group emerged. In January 2003, the Connecticut-based Mohegan Native American Tribe bought the team.

The new owners moved the team to Uncasville, Connecticut and changed the nickname to the Sun (in reference to the tribe's Mohegan Sun casino.)  The Connecticut Sun's new nickname and logo were reminiscent of another Florida-based WNBA franchise, the Miami Sol, which folded at the same time as the Miracle.

Uniforms
1999–2002: For home games, white with blue on the sides and shoulders and white Miracle logo text on the chest. For away games, blue with white on the sides and white Miracle logo text on the chest. The Miracle logo is on the shorts.

Season-by-season records

Players

Final roster

Former players

Cintia dos Santos 2000–2002
Katie Douglas 2001–2002
Jessie Hicks 2000–2002
Adrienne Johnson 1999–2002
Shannon Johnson 1999–2002
Carla McGhee 1999–2002
Taj McWilliams-Franklin 1999–2002
Elaine Powell 1999–2002
Nykesha Sales 1999–2002
Brooke Wyckoff 2001–2002
Monica "Monee" Sheppard

Coaches

Head coaches

General managers
Carolyn Peck (1999-2002)
Dee Brown (2002)

Assistant coaches
Rick Stukes (1999–2000)
Charlene Thomas-Swinson (1999–2001)
Michael Peck (2001)
Vonn Read (2002)
Valerie Still (2002)

All-time notes

Draft picks
Current WNBA players are in italics.
1999 Expansion Draft: Andrea Congreaves (2), Kisha Ford (4), Yolanda Moore (6), Adrienne Johnson (8)
1999 WNBA Draft: Tari Phillips (8), Sheri Sam (20), Taj McWilliams-Franklin (32), Carla McGhee (44), Elaine Powell (50)
2000 WNBA Draft: Cintia dos Santos (4), Jannon Roland (20), Shawnetta Stewart (36), Romona Hanzova (52)
2001 WNBA Draft: Katie Douglas (10), Brooke Wyckoff (26), Jaclyn Johnson (42), Anne Thorius (58)
2002 WNBA Draft: Davalyn Cunningham (23), Saundra Jackson (39), Tomeka Brown (55)

Trades
April 18, 2002: The Miracle acquire Clarisse Machanguana from the Charlotte Sting for the Miracle's first-round pick in the 2002 WNBA Draft.
July 8, 2002: The Miracle acquire Wendy Palmer from the Detroit Shock for Elaine Powell.

All-Stars
1999: Taj McWilliams-Franklin, Shannon Johnson, Nykesha Sales
2000: Taj McWilliams-Franklin, Shannon Johnson, Nykesha Sales
2001: Taj McWilliams-Franklin, Nykesha Sales
2002: Shannon Johnson, Nykesha Sales

Regular season attendance
A sellout for a basketball game at TD Waterhouse Center is 17,248.

References 

 
Basketball teams established in 1999
Basketball teams disestablished in 2002
Relocated Women's National Basketball Association teams
Basketball teams in Florida
1999 establishments in Florida
2002 disestablishments in Florida